is an opera in two acts by Heinrich Sutermeister. The composer wrote the libretto, after Shakespeare's Romeo and Juliet.

Erik Levi explains that the opera: "presents a synthesis of Romantic and impressionist elements. It marks a ... return to the conception of opera as a sequence of closed forms, incorporating ... stylistic features related to madrigal, oratorio and pantomime."

Performance history
It was first performed on 13 April 1940, at the Semperoper, Dresden, under the musical direction of Karl Böhm, who also commissioned the work, with Maria Cebotari as Julia, and was a considerable success. It was also performed at Sadler's Wells in London in the mid-50s.

Roles

Synopsis
Sutermeister's version follows Shakespeare's plot. In the final scene, a celestial chorus celebrate the union in death of the two lovers.

Recordings
Sutermeister: Romeo und Julia – Bavarian Radio Chorus, Tölzer Knabenchor, Munich Radio Orchestra
Conductor: Heinz Wallberg
Principal singers: Ferry Gruber, Raimund Grumbach, Nikolaus Hillebrand, Urszula Koszut, Hildegard Laurich, Theodor Nicolai, Adolf Dallapozza, Paul Hansen, Alexander Malta, Gudrun Wewezow, Joern W. Wilsing, Heinrich Weber, Anton Rosner
Recording date: 1980?
Label: Musiques Suisses – 6263 (2 CDs)

References

Sources

Operas by Heinrich Sutermeister
German-language operas
Operas
1929 operas
Operas based on Romeo and Juliet